This article presents a list of the historical events and publications of Australian literature during 1953.

Books 

 Charmian Clift and George Johnston – The Big Chariot
 Dymphna Cusack – Southern Steel
 Eleanor Dark – No Barrier
 T. A. G. Hungerford – Riverslake
 Eve Langley – Wild Australia
 Jack Lindsay – Betrayed Spring : A Novel of the British Way
 Ruth Park – A Power of Roses
 Nevil Shute – In the Wet
 Kylie Tennant – The Joyful Condemned
 E. V. Timms – The Scarlet Frontier
 Arthur Upfield – Murder Must Wait

Short stories 

 A. Bertram Chandler – "Jetsam"
 T. Inglis Moore – Australia Writes: An Anthology (edited)
 Stephen Murray-Smith – The Tracks We Travel : Australian Short Stories (edited)
 Colin Roderick – Australian Round-Up : Stories from 1790 to 1950 (edited)
 Dal Stivens – The Gambling Ghost and Other Tales
 Judith Wright – "The Weeping Fig"

Children's and Young Adult fiction 

 K. Langloh Parker – Australian Legendary Tales, edited by Henrietta Drake-Brockman, illustrated by Elizabeth Durack
 Joan Phipson – Good Luck to the Rider, illustrated by Margaret Horder

Poetry 

 John Blight
 "Cormorants"
 "Crab"
 "Mangrove"
 "Stonefish and Starfish"
 Dulcie Deamer – The Blue Centaur
 Rosemary Dobson – "The Birth"
 Mary Gilmore – "Old Botany Bay"
 A. D. Hope – "Imperial Adam"
 James McAuley – "Late Winter"
 David Martin – "Bush Christmas"
 T. Inglis Moore – Australia Writes : An Anthology (edited)
 Marjorie Pizer – Freedom on the Wallaby (edited)
 Elizabeth Riddell – "Country Tune"
 Roland Robinson – Tumult of the Swans
 Douglas Stewart – "Christmas Bells"
 Francis Webb – Birthday
 Judith Wright
 "The Harp and the King"
 "Request to a Year"
 The Gateway

Biography 

 Catherine Beatrice Edmonds – Caddie, A Sydney Barmaid
 Frank Hardy – Ambrose Dyson : Man and Artist of the People
 Margaret Herron – Down the Years

Non-Fiction 

 James H. Martin & W. D. Martin – Aircraft of Today and Tomorrow

Awards and honours

Literary

Children's and Young Adult

Poetry

Births 

A list, ordered by date of birth (and, if the date is either unspecified or repeated, ordered alphabetically by surname) of births in 1953 of Australian literary figures, authors of written works or literature-related individuals follows, including year of death.

 9 January – Morris Gleitzman, writer for children
 12 January – David Brooks, novelist and poet
 5 February – Rod Jones, novelist
 13 March – Stephen Sewell, playwright
 18 April – Leigh Hobbs, artist and writer for children
 14 May – Kerryn Goldsworthy, academic, editor and critic
 30 August – Ross Clark, poet
 29 November – Jackie French, writer for children

Unknown date
 Marion Lennox, novelist
 Ian McBryde, poet
 Shane Maloney, novelist
 Chris Mansell, poet and publisher

Deaths 

A list, ordered by date of death (and, if the date is either unspecified or repeated, ordered alphabetically by surname) of deaths in 1953 of Australian literary figures, authors of written works or literature-related individuals follows, including year of birth.

 9 April – Albert Dorrington, novelist (born 1874)
 11 May – Leonora Polkinghorne, novelist and poet (born 1873)
 30 June – Beatrice Grimshaw, novelist and travel writer (born 1870)
 12 August – J. H. M. Abbott, novelist and poet (born 1874)
 1 September – Bernard O'Dowd, poet (born 1866)
 14 December – Dora Wilcox, poet and playwright (born 1873)

Unknown Date
 Guy Innes, journalist (born 1879)

See also 
 1953 in Australia
 1953 in literature
 1953 in poetry
 List of years in Australian literature
 List of years in literature

References

 
Australian literature by year
20th-century Australian literature
1953 in literature